Mehran Kashani  (born 1969), is an Iranian Screenwriter. Graduated as a mechanical engineer, Kashani began his career in cinema as assistant director in Under the Moonlight and Here Is A Shining Light (Directed by Reza Mirkarimi, in the latter he was also the script consultant. Since 2003, Kashani has continued his writing career and worked with famous Iranian Directors such as Majid Majidi and Reza Mirkarimi.

He has also played a role in Mirkarimi's As Simple as That (film).

Filmography

References

External links

1969 births
Living people
Iranian screenwriters
People from Masjed Soleyman